The Road to Romance is a 1927 American silent action film directed by John S. Robertson, based upon the 1903 Joseph Conrad-Ford Madox Ford novel Romance. A copy of the film survives at the New Zealand Film Archive.

Plot
Serafina (Marceline Day) is captured by Don Balthasar (Roy D'Arcy)'s pirates on a Caribbean island, when José Armando (Ramon Novarro) arrives from Spain to the rescue.

Cast
 Ramon Novarro as José Armando 
 Marceline Day as Serafina 
 Marc McDermott as Pópolo 
 Roy D'Arcy as Don Balthasar 
 Cesare Gravina as Castro
 Jules Cowles as Smoky Beard
 John George
 Bobbie Mack as Drunkard (credited as Bobby Mack)
 Otto Matieson as Don Carlos (credited as Otto Matiesen)

References

External links

Stills of Ramon Novarro and Marc McDermott at gettyimages.com

1927 films
Metro-Goldwyn-Mayer films
American silent feature films
American black-and-white films
1927 romantic drama films
Films based on British novels
Films based on works by Joseph Conrad
Ford Madox Ford
American romantic drama films
American action films
1920s action films
1920s American films
Silent romantic drama films
Silent American drama films